La Alcaidesa is a gated community (known as an urbanización in Spanish) near Sotogrande, Spain (within the municipalities of La Línea de la Concepción and San Roque), in the Andalusian province of Cádiz, accessed by junction 124 on the Autovía A-7 coastal motorway. The natural topography allows the town to enjoy an enviable location overlooking the Mediterranean with easy access to Gibraltar, the Campo and the towns of Algeciras and Marbella. The town has two staffed, gated access points and mobile security patrols. A fire station exclusively serving Alcaidesa was built in 2008. The town boasts two golf courses, the original is links style, said to be the only one in Spain. The second is a more traditional heathland course.  The popular beach called Playa de La Alcaidesa is linked to Playa de La Hacienda, looking towards La Linea it is possible to see Gibraltar (a British overseas territory).

Location

The main access to the urbanization is via a tree-lined avenue with panoramic views of the Bay. Gibraltar Airport is twenty-minutes-drive away, Malaga International Airport, a one hour drive east and Jerez Airport one and a half hours to the west. A regular bus service operates between Gibraltar and Alcaidesa with a journey time of under thirty minutes. A number of local schools operate a student shuttle service to and from the town.

The exclusive resort of Sotogrande renowned for its sporting facilities is close by. Sotogrande is home to the Santa Maria Polo Club, a tennis academy, a number of other sporting facilities and is considered to be one of the most luxurious urbanizations in Europe. The surrounding area is a haven for golf lovers with five fine courses close by including the world famous Valderama, past home to the Ryder Cup and the European Masters.

History

Construction originally started in the 1990s. La Alcaidesa Inmobiliaria (the Costain/Banesto joint venture company) owned the land and since that time a number of developers have completed further independent communities. The much-improved Spanish economy has provided new confidence among developers with a number of new builds under construction and other contractors lining up to break ground. There are a couple of hotels, one exclusively serves the German market (Aldiana). A small shop selling essentials opened in March 2011 and a pharmacy is on duty. There are two restaurants in the town square and a further all year-round beach bar providing seating inside and out and open throughout the day and evening serving a mixture of meat and fish dishes. A further mall has been constructed with a number of the units now occupied.

in July 2015 there was a reorganisation of the owners due to debts being owed to Banco Santander, Santander now own the two largest pieces of development land currently. Costain own the operating assets of the golf courses and the marina concession, and the associated smaller parcels of land and will retain the balance of the outstanding debt.

In July 2016 wildfires forced the evacuation of many properties and hotels in Alcaidesa.

In 2019 Grupo Millennium purchased Alcaidesa Holding and its subsidiary Alcaidesa Golf SLU for over €15 million from the Costain Group, with plans to build Villas and a hotel.

In summer 2020 works began on the new five-star Millenium hotel in Alcaidesa that is planned to be named "La Hacienda". The first hotel of this category in the Campo de Gibraltar. This new hotel complex will be built on the H3 plot of Alcaidesa with sea views offering 144 rooms.

Architecture

There are various independent communities within La Alcaidesa, such as La Corona, a complex of modern townhouses.

Another increasingly popular resort near the top of the hill, is Terrazas de Alcaidesa. It nestles in a small valley next to the nature reserve and just below the Golf Club. It comprises just eight buildings of three floors, comprising 110 two and three bedroom apartments, most of which have front and rear terraces. Many apartments are owner occupied, whilst others serve as holiday lets. In the centre are three attractive swimming pools with showers and changing facilities and a paddle tennis court.

References 

Resorts in Spain
La Línea de la Concepción
San Roque, Cádiz
Beaches of Andalusia